The 22827/22828 Puri–Surat Express is a Superfast train running between  of Odisha and  of Gujarat.

It operates as train number 22827 from Puri to Surat and as train number 22828 in the reverse direction serving the states of Gujarat, Maharashtra, Chhattisgarh and Odisha.

Coach composition 

The train consists of 22 coaches:

 1 AC II Tier
 4 AC III Tier
 10 Sleeper Class
 5 General Unreserved
 2 End-on Generator

Services

22827  Puri–Surat Express covers the distance of 1757 km in 31 hours 35 mins (56 km/hr) & in 31 hours 45 mins as 22828 Surat–Puri Express (55 km/hr).

Route and Halts 

The important halts of the train are:

Rake sharing

The train shares its rake with 18419/18420 Puri–Jaynagar Express.

Schedule

Traction 

Both trains are hauled by Locomotive shed, Vadodara or Locomotive shed, Visakhapatnam-based WAP-4 or WAP-7 from end to end.

See also

List of named passenger trains of India
Indian Railways – Travel Coach types and their seating / berths

References

Transport in Surat
Transport in Puri
Rail transport in Odisha
Rail transport in Chhattisgarh
Rail transport in Maharashtra
Rail transport in Gujarat
Express trains in India